Jean De Rode (born 30 September 1913, date of death unknown) was a Belgian rower. He competed in the men's coxed four at the 1936 Summer Olympics.

References

1913 births
Year of death missing
Belgian male rowers
Olympic rowers of Belgium
Rowers at the 1936 Summer Olympics
Place of birth missing